Sakthi is a Tamil soap opera on Sun TV. The show premiered on 2 June 2014. It is an adaptation of the Hindi serial Dil Se Di Dua... Saubhagyavati Bhava?. The show stars Arnav and Manesha Chatarji.

The show is produced by Cine Times Entertainment and directed by Sadhasivam Perumal.  The show last aired on 27 March 2015. It also aired in Sri Lanka on the Tamil channel Shakthi TV.

Cast 
 Manesha Chatarji as Shakthi
Arnav as Arya
 Lalitha Patty as Patty
 Fawaz Zayani as Jeeva
 Manu Murali as Kumar
 Anuradha Krishnamoorthi as Logeshwari
 Aadarsh Nair as Prabhakar
 Aswini Achu as sub inspector of police, Anu
 Mohan Sharma as Rajagopal
 Arun Bhai as Peter
 Usha Sai as Saranya
Yuvasri Lakshmi as Shakthi's Sister

Awards and honours

See also
 List of programs broadcast by Sun TV

References

 Sakthi Serial on Sun TV 
 Cine Time to Launch New Daily Soap On SUN TV 'Sakthi'

External links
 Official website 
 Sun TV on YouTube
 Sun TV Network 
 Sun Group 

Sun TV original programming
Tamil-language romance television series
Tamil-language thriller television series
2014 Tamil-language television series debuts
Tamil-language television shows
2015 Tamil-language television series endings
Tamil-language television series based on Hindi-language television series